The 1963–64 season was the 62nd in the history of the Western Football League.

The champions for the first time in their history were Bideford.

Final table
The league remained at 22 clubs after Bristol Rovers Colts left and one new club joined:

Frome Town, rejoining after leaving the league in 1960.
Bideford Town changed their name to Bideford.

References

1963-64
5